is a Japanese former professional racing cyclist and directeur sportif, active in cycling between 1996 and 2018.

Biography
Born in Nagano Prefecture, Fukushima started cycling at Shinshu University and practised road racing in the Netherlands before becoming professional with Team Bridgestone Anchor in 1996. He has competed around the world, winning races in both Asia and Europe. He became national champion in 2003 and became the first and still only Japanese to win the overall classification at the Tour of Japan in 2004. He won the overall at the 2005 Tour of Siam and became only the third Asian to win a stage at the Tour de Langkawi in 2007, where he also won the blue jersey as the best Asian rider in 2008.

With his brother Koji Fukushima, also a professional cyclist, he has been involved in the development of young riders, in part by starting the development team Bonne Chance, with the help of Daihatsu, where their father works. In 2010, at the age of 38 and even after suffering a tire puncture, Fukushima won the Japanese National Road Racing Time Trial Championship with a course record.

In October 2013, Fukushima announced that he would retire at the end of the season.

Major results

1999
 3rd Tour de Okinawa
2001
 2nd Prix d'Armorique
2002
 1st Stage 5 Tour of Japan
 2nd Men's Madison Asian Games
 3rd Overall Circuit de Saône-et-Loire
2003
 1st  Road race, National Road Championships
 1st Stage 4 Tour de Hokkaido
2004
 1st  Overall Tour of Japan
 1st GP Saint-Etienne Loire
 1st Stage 2 Tour of Serbia
 2nd Overall Tour of China
 2nd Tour de Okinawa
 3rd Overall Circuit des Ardennes
1st Stage 1
2005
 1st  Overall Tour of Siam
1st Stage 3
2006
 1st Stage 1 Vuelta Ciclista a León
 2nd Road race, Asian Road Championships
 2nd Overall Tour of Siam
1st Stage 1
 3rd Flèche Hesbignonne Cras Avernas
 3rd Châteauroux Classic
2007
 1st Stage 7 Tour de Langkawi
 2nd Overall Tour de Korea
1st Stage 1
2008
 1st Stage 3 Tour of Japan
2009
 2nd Kumamoto International Road Race
 3rd Overall Tour de Okinawa
2010
 1st  Time trial, National Road Championships
 1st  Overall Tour de Okinawa
1st Stage 2
 3rd Overall Tour de Kumano
2011
 1st  Overall Tour de Brunei
 Tour d'Indonesia
1st Stages 8 & 10
 1st Stage 5 Tour de Taiwan
2012
 Jelajah Malaysia
1st Stages 1 & 6

References

External links

Official site (Japanese)
Bonne Chance Iida official site (Japanese)

1971 births
Living people
Japanese male cyclists
People from Nagano Prefecture
Asian Games medalists in cycling
Cyclists at the 2002 Asian Games
Medalists at the 2002 Asian Games
Asian Games silver medalists for Japan